William Charles Pearce (March 17, 1885 – May 22, 1933) was a professional baseball player.  He was a catcher for two seasons (1908–1909) with the Cincinnati Reds.  For his career, he compiled no hits in 4 at-bats.

References

1880s births
1933 deaths
Cincinnati Reds players
Major League Baseball catchers
Baseball players from Ohio
Minor league baseball managers
Evansville River Rats players
Terre Haute Hottentots players
Springfield Senators players
Bloomington Bloomers players
Newark Newks players
Dayton Veterans players
Oakland Oaks (baseball) players
Indianapolis Indians players
Louisville Colonels (minor league) players
Jersey City Skeeters players